Marine Parade is a planning area and residential estate located in the Central Region of Singapore. Straddling the tip of the southeastern coast of Pulau Ujong, Marine Parade serves as a buffer between the Central and East regions of the city-state. Bordering it are the planning areas of Geylang to the north, Kallang to the northwest, Bedok to the northeast, Marina East to the southwest and the Singapore Straits to the south.

Background 
Marine Parade's early history can be associated with the precinct of Katong. Throughout the early to mid 20th century, the area was a haven for the wealthy Peranakan community of Singapore. Katong witnessed a growth in Straits Chinese culture, developing a distinctive architecture style and even becoming the place of origin for the renowned Katong Laksa dish. Marine Parade, as it is known today, mainly consists of HDB (Housing Development Board) flats along the southernmost points of the estate. These were built in the 1970s after the reclamation of the island's east coast. Today, many private condominiums are also being built in the area.

Infrastructure
The main public housing estate comprises 58 blocks of HDB flats. The public estate is bisected by the arterial Still Road South that provides access to the major highway, East Coast Parkway, leading to the city area and to Singapore Changi Airport.

Marine Parade will be served by the Mass Rapid Transit network when its station on the Thomson–East Coast line stage four opens by 2024.

Community Building

The Marine Parade Community Building was completed in 2000. It houses the Marine Parade Community Club and the Marine Parade Public Library. Other facilities within the three-storey complex include a 263-seater theatrette, a glass-walled gymnasium, a covered basketball court on the rooftop, an air-conditioned and a sports hall.

Town Centre
Marine Parade, like other towns in Singapore, is served by a town centre. Dubbed Marine Parade Promenade, the centre itself consists of several neighbourhood shops, Parkway Centre and a commercial complex, Parkway Parade, that houses offices and a shopping mall.

Education
As Marine Parade is primarily either recreational or residential, it is also a host to a variety of schools.

 Primary Schools
 CHIJ (Katong) Primary 
 Ngee Ann Primary School
 Tao Nan School
 Haig Girls' School
 Secondary Schools
 CHIJ Katong Convent 
 St. Patrick's School 
 Chung Cheng High School (Main) 
 Tanjong Katong Secondary School 
 Tanjong Katong Girls' School 
 Victoria Junior College

Politics
Marine Parade is a component division of the Marine Parade Group Representation Constituency, which also includes the Braddell Heights, Geylang Serai, Kembangan-Chai Chee and Joo Chiat divisions and elects five members to Singapore's Parliament. Singapore's former Prime Minister Goh Chok Tong is the Member of Parliament who represents the Marine Parade division since the formation until his retirement in 2020, where Minister Tan See Leng succeeded Goh as the MP.

References

External links 
Marine Parade Town Council

 
Central Region, Singapore
Housing estates in Singapore
Places in Singapore